Kosali may refer to:

Languages 
 Sambalpuri language, a language of Odisha, India, where Kosali has been promoted as an alternative name
 the group of Eastern Hindi languages, including at least Awadhi

Other uses 
 Kosali (cattle), an Indian breed of cattle
 Kosalı, a village in Shaki Rayon, Azerbaijan
  (known as Kosalı in Azerbaijani), a settlement in Gardabani Municipality, Georgia
 Kosali Simon, American economist

See also 
 Kosal (disambiguation)
 Kosala (disambiguation)
 Kosli